Inmagic, Inc. is a company based in Woburn, Massachusetts that sells information management and library services software. It was founded in 1983 by Elizabeth Bole Eddison and Karen Brothers. Customers of its software have included Dow Chemicals, Kraft Foods, Lehman Brothers, and Yale University.

Inmagic's original mission was to create text management software that was flexible and affordable that would meet the needs of information professionals (special librarians) for information management and library services software.

History

Conception 
During the 1970’s Betty Eddison co-founded Warner Eddison Associates to help clients with information management problems. Shortly thereafter, Betty realized that manual typewriters were a very poor automation system for her business. Betty contacted Karen Brothers, who was running her own technology consulting business, and she asked Karen to help her buy an electronic typewriter. Instead, Karen helped Warner Eddison develop a much grander automation vision and Warner Eddison purchased a DEC PDP8 mini-computer and then hired Karen’s company to develop the indexing tools that would automate the firm’s consulting projects. After some additional development, ‘Inmagic’ the product was born. Inmagic was an early NoSQL document database (of course the product was built well before NoSQL was even a term, much less well understood as a technology).

Incorporation 
Inmagic, Inc. was incorporated and in 1984 it began selling Inmagic for DOS for $975. Shortly after incorporation, Karen Brothers become the President. After running Inmagic through its first six years, Karen decided the firm needed more professional management and in 1990 the firm hired Phillip Green as the CEO. Karen was then able to return to her core strengths and she took on the role of VP Engineering. Under Green, Inmagic released DB/TextWorks in 1995, its Windows replacement for the aging Inmagic DOS product line, and in 1996 a web-enabled version of DB/TextWorks was released, WebPublisher. In 2002, Inmagic shipped a version of DB/TextWorks and WebPublisher with a SQL back-end. By 2005, the company had built an installed base of over 5,000 installations in over 50 countries, and its products were used by over 1,000,000 users around the globe, In 2006, having led Inmagic over the previous 16 years, Phillip Green asked Paul Puzzanghera to become Inmagic’s CEO. Phil Green moved into the role of CTO to focus on Inmagic's next-generation product Presto, which was the world's first Social Knowledge Management platform.

Recent past 
Under Puzzanghera, the company takes its first external infusion of capital from Edison Ventures (no relation to founder Betty Eddison) and Inmagic is named to the KM 100 has a "Company that Matters in Knowledge Management", and  KMWorld names Inmagic Presto a KMWorld Trend-Setting Product. In 2009, Ron Matros becomes Inmagic's CEO and in 2011, Inmagic's assets are purchased by SydneyPLUS International (now Lucidea).

References

Information technology companies of the United States
Companies established in 1983